The Big Walker Mountain Tunnel is a vehicular tunnel in the Appalachian Mountains of Southwest Virginia that carries Interstate 77 through and under Big Walker Mountain.

History

The  tunnel was first opened in 1972 after five years of construction labor. It carried a price tag of $50 million (equivalent to $ in ), which at the time was the most expensive single project undertaken on Virginia's Interstate system. The opening of the tunnel reduced the travel time from Wytheville to Bland County by 30 minutes.

Preliminary engineering studies for the project were made by Brokenborough & Watkins, consulting engineers of Richmond, Virginia, and the final design of the roadway and tunnel was by Singstad & Kehart, consulting engineers of New York City.

References

Virginia asked to ease load restrictions in I-77 tunnels
VDOT Bristol District Information

External links

Information about I-77

Buildings and structures in Bland County, Virginia
Road tunnels in Virginia
Interstate 77
Buildings and structures in Wythe County, Virginia
Transportation in Wythe County, Virginia
Transportation in Bland County, Virginia
Tunnels completed in 1972